Shitlu is one of the largest villages in the Baramulla district of Jammu and Kashmir, India. This village is situated on Baramulla – Binner Road near Hanfia Masjid Sharief towards West, Khushi Pora village at a distance of 11.4 km towards North and Gulnar Park towards South which is 5.3 km away from the village. The district headquarters and administrative units of this village are located in Baramulla town, situated at a distance of 6 km via Azad Gunj village and Jhelum River.

Population
According to 2001 Census of India, the Shitlu village has a total population of 2926 which divides into 472 householders. The female population is 1376 and male population is 1550. The overall literacy rate is 67.20% against the total literacy rate 67.16% of the J&K state.

References 

Villages in Baramulla district